Huang Mengkai (born 6 September 1997) is a Chinese foil fencer. In 2018, he won the men's foil event at the 2018 Asian Games in Jakarta, Indonesia. He also won the bronze medal in the men's team foil event.

In 2014, he competed in fencing at the 2014 Summer Youth Olympics held in Nanjing, China without winning a medal. In 2021, he competed in the men's foil event at the 2020 Summer Olympics held in Tokyo, Japan.

References

External links 
 

Living people
1997 births
Place of birth missing (living people)
Chinese male foil fencers
Fencers at the 2014 Summer Youth Olympics
Fencers at the 2018 Asian Games
Medalists at the 2018 Asian Games
Asian Games gold medalists for China
Asian Games bronze medalists for China
Asian Games medalists in fencing
Fencers at the 2020 Summer Olympics
Olympic fencers of China
21st-century Chinese people